The Japan national kabaddi team represents Japan in international kabaddi.
It made its way to the semi finals in 2007 world cup of kabbadi which was its  best achievement. It is currently led by Mashayuki Shimokawa

Asian Games
 1990 - fourth
 1994 - fourth
 1998 - fifth
 2002 - fourth
 2006 - fifth
 2010 - Semi finals
 2014 - seventh
 2018 - seventh

Asian Indoor Games
 2007 – Group Stage
 2009 – Group Stage

World Cup
 2004 – Quarter finals
 2007 – Semi finals
 2016 – Group Stage

References

External links
 

Kabaddi
National kabaddi teams
National kabaddi team